Peter Ignaz Johann Halm, later Von Halm (14 December 1854, Mainz  25 January 1923, Munich), was a German etcher who served as a professor of etching at the Academy of Fine Arts, Munich, from 1901 to 1923.

Biography

He was the son of an innkeeper and brewer. Initially, he wanted to become an architect and, in pursuit of that goal, attended the Technische Universität Darmstadt. After 1875, he studied copper engraving with Johann Leonhard Raab and general art subjects with Ludwig von Löfftz, at the Munich Academy. 

From 1883 to 1885, he lived in Berlin at the invitation of his friend, Karl Stauffer-Bern, where he created graphic versions of the Old Masters for Wilhelm von Bode, Director of the Berlin State Museums. His younger brother,  (later an art historian), came under his tutelage during this time. 

In 1893, he married Katharina Müller (1873-1953), the daughter of a wealthy leather merchant, and they had three sons. 

He began teaching at the Munich Academy in 1896. Five years later, he was named a Professor there and eventually took over the management of the classes taught by his former mentor, Raab. His students there included René Beeh, Willi Geiger, 
, Hermann Kätelhön,  and Walter Bud. 

In late 1922, he became seriously ill and tendered his resignation, effective Jan. 1, 1923. He died three weeks later. A complete collection of his graphic works is maintained at the Staatliche Graphische Sammlung München. Most are landscapes and village scenes.

His son,  was a well known economist.

References

Further reading
 
 Peter Halm: Handzeichnungen, Radierungen, Dokumente – 6.5.–8.6.1981, Mittelrheinisches Landesmuseum, Mainz., 1981.
 Ingrid Bisswurm: Das druckgebundene Werk von Peter Halm (1854–1923). Dissertation, Universität Freiburg, 1991. Walter, Heitersheim 1993.

External links

 
 Peter Halm @ Galerie Saxonia (with works)

1854 births
1923 deaths
German etchers
Academy of Fine Arts, Munich alumni
Academic staff of the Academy of Fine Arts, Munich
Artists from Mainz
Technische Universität Darmstadt alumni